St. Norbert refers to Norbert of Xanten, saint and founder of the Norbertine or Premonstratensian order, and may also refer to:
St. Norbert, a provincial electoral division in the Canadian province of Manitoba
St. Norbert, Manitoba, the area of Winnipeg in roughly the same area as the above
Saint-Norbert, Quebec, a parish municipality in Canada
Saint-Norbert-d'Arthabaska, Quebec, a municipality in Canada
Saint-Norbert, a community in Weldford, New Brunswick, Canada
St. Norbert College, a college in Wisconsin, USA
St. Norbert College (Perth), a secondary school in Perth, Australia
Convento de San Norberto, a former convent in Madrid